Bombus nobilis is a species of bumblebee.

References

Bumblebees
Insects described in 1905